Newman Nunataks

These are a group of nunataks about 19 km west of Aker Peaks, and 26 km west of Mount Elkins, in Enderby Land, Antarctica. Their position was plotted from air photographs taken by ANARE in 1956 and 1960. They were named after A.J. Newman, senior diesel mechanic at Mawson Station in 1961.

Further reading 
 Darcy Broughton, The potential for mineral exploration and extraction in Antarctica, P 6

See also 
 History of Antarctica
 List of Antarctic expeditions
 Research stations in Antarctica

References

External links 
 Australian Antarctic Division
 Australian Antarctic Gazetteer
 Scientific Committee on Antarctic Research (SCAR)
 PDF Map of the Australian Antarctic Territory

Nunataks of Enderby Land